The Atacama myotis (Myotis atacamensis) is a species of vesper bat in the family Vespertilionidae. 
It is found in Chile and Peru, an example ecoregion of occurrence being the Chilean matorral.

Taxonomy
This species was first described in 1892 by French zoologist Fernand Lataste. The three samples that he had access to were all collected from the Atacama Desert, likely inspiring the species name.
Several have classified the Atacama myotis as a subspecies of the Chilean myotis in 1943 and 1958.
Lataste, however, thought that it differed greatly from the Chilean myotis because it is much smaller, it has a different skull shape, and its teeth are different.
In 1973, it was again listed as a species, which has been maintained at present.

Description
It is one of the smallest Myotis species found in South America and Chile.
They weigh .
It is similar in size to the recently discovered Myotis diminutus, but the two can be differentiated by their uropatagia. In the Atacama myotis, the dorsal side of the uropatagium is furred until halfway between the knee and ankle. In M. diminutus, the dorsal side of the uropatagium is almost naked.
Their dorsal fur is soft and tricolored. The base of its hair is black.

Biology
It is insectivorous, capturing its prey during flight.
It begins to forage one hour before dusk, and its foraging lasts about three hours.
They are colonial, and form colonies of around 30 individuals.
This is the only neotropical Myotis that hibernates.

Range and habitat
It is found in arid and semi-arid environments.
In 2013, this species was discovered for the first time in the Choapa Province of Chile, which was the southernmost extent of their range documented.
In 2014, the range was once again extended to the south when an individual was captured in La Campana National Park.
Unlike the arid or semi-arid environments where this species has previously been documented, La Campana National Park has a Mediterranean climate.
Based on the landscape where they are found, it is possible that they roost in rock crevices.
They have been observed roosting under the roof of a house.

Conservation
The species' conservation status has changed in three consecutive evaluations by the IUCN. In 1996, it was classed as vulnerable. In 2008, it was classed as near threatened. In 2016, its classification was changed to endangered.
Threats to this species include mining, urbanization, agriculture, and wind power.

References

Mouse-eared bats
Bats of South America
Mammals of Chile
Mammals of Peru
Chilean Matorral
Mammals described in 1892
Taxonomy articles created by Polbot